Coonana is a small Aboriginal community  in Western Australia located  east of Perth, between Kalgoorlie and Laverton in the Goldfields-Esperance region of Western Australia. At the 2006 census, Coonana had a population of 83.

References 

Aboriginal communities in Goldfields-Esperance